Earl of Balfour is a title in the Peerage of the United Kingdom. It was created in 1922 for Conservative politician Arthur Balfour, Prime Minister of the United Kingdom from 1902 to 1905 and Foreign Secretary from 1916 to 1919.

The earldom was created with special remainder, failing male issue of his own, to:
 his younger brother, the Right Honourable Gerald William Balfour, and the heirs male of his body, failing which to
 his nephew Francis Cecil Campbell Balfour and the heirs male of his body, and failing which to
 his nephew Oswald Herbert Campbell Balfour and the heirs male of his body.

The latter two were the sons of his deceased youngest brother Colonel Eustace James Anthony Balfour. Balfour was made Viscount Traprain, of Whittingehame in the County of Haddington, at the same time as he was given the earldom. This title is also in the Peerage of the United Kingdom and was created with similar remainder.

Balfour never married, and was succeeded according to the special remainders by his younger brother Gerald, the second Earl. He was also a Conservative politician and notably served as Chief Secretary for Ireland, as President of the Board of Trade and as President of the Local Government Board. This line of the family failed on the death of his grandson, the fourth Earl, in 2003.  the titles are held by his second cousin once removed, the fifth Earl. He is the grandson of the aforementioned Francis Cecil Campbell Balfour, nephew of the first Earl.

The family seat is Burpham Lodge, near Arundel, Sussex.

Earl of Balfour (1922)
Arthur James Balfour, 1st Earl of Balfour (1848–1930)
Gerald William Balfour, 2nd Earl of Balfour (1853–1945)
Robert Arthur Lytton Balfour, 3rd Earl of Balfour (1902–1968)
Gerald Arthur James Balfour, 4th Earl of Balfour (1925–2003)
Roderick Francis Arthur Balfour, 5th Earl of Balfour (born 1948)

The heir presumptive is the present holder's brother, the Hon. Charles George Yule Balfour (born 1951).
The heir presumptive's heir apparent is his son, George Eustace Charles Balfour (born 1991).

Male-line family tree

Line of succession

 James Maitland Balfour (1820–1856)
  Arthur James Balfour, 1st Earl of Balfour (1848–1930)
  Gerald William Balfour, 2nd Earl of Balfour (1853–1945)
  Robert Arthur Lytton Balfour, 3rd Earl of Balfour (1902–1968)
  Gerald Arthur James Balfour, 4th Earl of Balfour (1925–2003)
 Col. Eustace James Anthony Balfour (1854–1911)
 Lt. Col. Francis Cecil Campbell Balfour (1884–1965)
 Eustace Arthur Goschen Balfour (1921–2000)
  Roderick Francis Arthur Balfour, 5th Earl of Balfour (born 1948)
 (1) Hon. Charles George Yule Balfour (born 1951)
 (2) George Eustace Charles Balfour (born 1991)

See also
Francis Maitland Balfour
James Maitland Balfour

Notes and references

Notes

References

Earldoms in the Peerage of the United Kingdom
Earl
 Earls
Noble titles created in 1922
Noble titles created for UK MPs
Earl
Peerages created for the Prime Minister of the United Kingdom
Peerages created with special remainders